The Dunrobin Detachment was a military-operated radio communications receiver station linked by land line to CFS Carp located on the corner of Dunrobin Road and Vance's Side Road NW of Dunrobin, Ontario.  A second antenna receiver site was located further West near Almonte, Ontario; the Almonte Detachment.  The detachment was unmanned and the location primarily used as a remote antenna farm.  After the end of the Cold war, CFS Carp was decommissioned and the antenna site was no longer needed.

References 

Military radio systems
1962 establishments in Ontario
1994 disestablishments in Ontario
Dunrobin